The 966th Airborne Air Control Squadron is an active United States Air Force unit is assigned to the 552d Training Group, 552d Air Control Wing at Tinker Air Force Base, Oklahoma.  It operates the E-3 Sentry (AWACS) aircraft conducting airborne command and control missions.

The squadron is the E-3 Sentry formal training unit (FTU) for all Airborne Warning and Control System aircrew and currently falls under the authority of Air Combat Command and Fifteenth Air Force.

Mission
The 966th Airborne Air Control Squadron is Air Combat Command's largest flying training unit, providing training for all active and reserve E-3 Sentry pilots and mission crew. Training approximately 500 students every year.

Provide the Combat Air Force with airborne systems and personnel for surveillance, warning and control of strategic, tactical, and special mission forces.

History

World War II
The squadron conducted replacement training from August 1942 – November 1943 and flew evacuation missions and light transport services for ground forces in Burma from 13 November 1944 – 10 May 1945.

Airborne warning and control
It provided airborne radar surveillance from 1962 to 1969 and rotated aircrews to Southeast Asia from c. 4 April 1965 – c. December 1969.  The 966th has trained aircrews since 1977.

Lineage
 466th Bombardment Squadron
 Constituted as the 466th Bombardment Squadron (Heavy) on 9 July 1942
 Activated on 15 July 1942
 Inactivated on 1 April 1944
 Consolidated with the 166th Liaison Squadron and the 966th Airborne Warning and Control Training Squadron as the 966th Airborne Warning and Control Training Squadron on 19 September 1985

 166th Liaison Squadron
 Constituted as the 166th Liaison Squadron (Commando) on 9 August 1944
 Activated on 3 September 1944
 Inactivated on 3 November 1945
 Consolidated with the 466th Bombardment Squadron and the 966th Airborne Warning and Control Training Squadron as the 966th Airborne Warning and Control Training Squadron on 19 September 1985

966th Airborne Early Warning and Control Squadron
 Constituted as the 966th Airborne Early Warning and Control Squadron and activated on 18 December 1961 (not organized)
 Organized on 1 February 1962
 Inactivated on 31 December 1969
 Redesignated 966th Airborne Warning and Control Training Squadron on 5 May 1976
 Activated on 1 July 1976
966th Airborne Air Control Squadron
Consolidated with the 166th Liaison Squadron and the 466th Bombardment Squadron on 19 September 1985
 Redesignated 966th Airborne Air Control Squadron on 1 July 1994

Assignments
 333d Bombardment Group, 15 July 1942 – 1 April 1944
 1st Air Commando Group, 3 September 1944 – 3 November 1945
 Air Defense Command, 18 December 1961 (not organized)
 551st Airborne Early Warning and Control Wing, 1 February 1962
 552d Airborne Early Warning and Control Wing, 1 May 1963
 551st Airborne Early Warning and Control Wing, 1 July 1969
 552d Airborne Early Warning and Control Wing, 15 November-31 December 1969
 552d Airborne Warning and Control Wing (later 552d Airborne Warning and Control Division; 552d Airborne Warning and Control Wing; 552d Air Control Wing), 1 July 1976
 552d Operations Group, 29 May 1992 – present

Stations

 Topeka Army Air Base, Kansas, 15 July 1942
 Dalhart Army Air Field, Texas, 22 February 1943 – 1 April 1944
 Burnpur Airfield, India, 3 September 1944
 Yazagyo Airfield, Burma, 13 November 1944
 Inbaung Airfield, Burma, 12 December 1944
 Burnpur Airfield, India, 19 December 1944 (detachment operated from Arakan Airfield, Burma, c. 29 December 1944 – 23 January 1945)
 Sinthe Airfield, Burma, 4 February 1945

 Burnpur Airfield, India, 14 March 1945
 Ondaw Airfield, Burma, 29 March 1945
 Meiktila Airfield, Burma, 5 April 1945
 Toungoo Airfield, Burma, 27 April 1945
 Burnpur Airfield, India, 14 May – 6 October 1945
 Camp Kilmer, New Jersey, 1–3 November 1945
 McCoy Air Force Base, Florida, 1 February 1962 – 31 December 1969
 Tinker Air Force Base, Oklahoma, 1 July 1976 – present

Aircraft

 Boeing B-17 Flying Fortress (1942)
 Consolidated B-24 Liberator (1942–1943)
 Stinson L-5 Sentinel (1944–1945)
 Noorduyn C-64 Norseman (1944–1945)
 Lockheed RC-121 Constellation (1962–1963)

 Lockheed TC-121 Constellation (1962–1963)
 Lockheed EC-121 Warning Star (1963–1969)
 Boeing WC-135 Constant Phoenix (1977–1979)
 Boeing E-3 Sentry (1977–present)

Operations
World War II
Vietnam War

References

Notes

Bibliography

 
 
 

Military units and formations in Oklahoma
966
1942 establishments in Kansas